The President's Call to Service Award is awarded by the President of the United States to people who have completed more than 4,000 hours of community service. It is the highest level of the President's Volunteer Service Award.

Background
The President's Council on Service and Civic Participation, which administers the award, was established within the Corporation for National and Community Service through a 2003 executive order by President George W. Bush. The President's Volunteer Service Award (PVSA) encourages citizens to live a life of service. The award is offered in four categories depending on amount of service, including Bronze, Silver, Gold and the "President's Call to Service Award" (referred to as the "President's Lifetime Achievement Award"). Depending on the level of service, awardees may receive a personalized certificate, an official pin, medallion, and/or a congratulatory letter from the President.

Recipients must have contributed their volunteer hours under the auspices of a Certifying Organization/ Leadership Organization. That organization must submit an application on behalf of the intended recipient, a record of the volunteer's hours, and a payment to the PVSA.  The Organization must be based in the United States or Puerto Rico.  The award is not competitive, and there are no other requirements.

Notable recipients 
While numerous Americans have been awarded some degree of the President's Volunteer Service Award, comparatively few have been awarded the highest honor - the President's Call to Service Award (also referred to as the President's Lifetime Achievement Award).

Past recipients of the award include:
2004: Frank Shankwitz, Founder of Make A Wish Foundation
2005: Zach Bonner
2006 Lina Gilliland, Founder of NACAM Firm Inc 
2008: S. Truett Cathy
2014: Betsy Thies, 47-year volunteer at the Santa Barbara Botanic Garden
2017: Dee Dawkins-Haigler, former member of the Georgia House of Representatives

References

Humanitarian and service awards
Civil awards and decorations of the United States
American awards